Yibna (Jabneh or Jabneel in Biblical times; Jamnia in Roman times; Ibelin to the Crusaders), or Tel Yavne, is an archaeological site and depopulated Palestinian town. The ruins are located immediately southeast of the modern Israeli city of Yavne.

The town had a population of 5,420 in 1948, located 15 kilometers southwest of Ramla. Yibna was taken by Israeli forces on 4 June 1948, and was depopulated during the military assault and expulsion.

It is a significant site for post-biblical Jewish history, as it was the location of the Council of Jamnia, considered the birthplace of modern Rabbinic Judaism. It is also significant in the history of the Crusades, as the location of the House of Ibelin.

Name
In many English translations of the Bible, it is known as Yavne or Jabneh . During Greco-Roman times, it was known as Jamnia ( Iamníā); to the Crusaders as Ibelin; and before 1948, as Yibna.

History

Based on written sources and archaeology, the history of Yavneh/Jabneh/Yibna goes back to the Iron Age and possibly to the Bronze Age. The Hebrew Bible mentions Yavneh repeatedly, as does Josephus. For more see Yavne.

Bronze and Iron Age
Salvage excavations carried out in 2001 by the Israel Antiquities Authority uncovered several burials at the northern foot of the original tell. Most of the burials are dated to the later Iron Age. One burial points to a late Bronze Age occupation.

A large Philistine favissa (deposit of cultic artifacts) was discovered on Temple Hill. Two excavation seasons in the 2000s led by Professor Dan Bahat revealed some Iron Age remains. Pottery sherds of the Iron Age and Persian period were discovered at the surface of the tell.

Roman period with Herodians
In Roman times, the city was known as Iamnia, also spelled Jamnia. It was bequeathed by King Herod upon his death to his sister Salome. Upon her death it passed to Emperor Augustus, who managed it as a private imperial estate, a status it was to maintain for at least a century. After Salome's death, Iamnia came into the property of Livia, the future Roman empress, and then to her son Tiberius.

During the First Jewish–Roman War, when the Roman army had quelled the insurrection in Galilee, the army then marched upon Iamnia and Azotus, taking both towns and stationing garrisons within them. According to rabbinic tradition, Rabbi Yohanan ben Zakkai and his disciples were permitted to settle in Iamnia during the outbreak of the war, after Zakkai, realizing that Jerusalem was about to fall, sneaked out of the city and asked Vespasian, the commander of the besieging Roman forces, for the right to settle in Yavne and teach his disciples. Upon the fall of Jerusalem, his school functioned as a re-establishment of the Sanhedrin.

Byzantine period

Byzantine period finds from excavations include an aqueduct east of the tell, and a kiln. The world's largest wine factory from the Byzantine period has been uncovered by Israeli archaeologists, after a two-year excavation process; the importance of its wine was exemplified by its use by emperor Justin II in 566 at his table during his coronation feast.

Early Islamic period
The Islamic historian al-Baladhuri (died 892 CE) mentioned Yibna as one of ten towns in Jund Filastin conquered by the Rashidun army led by 'Amr ibn al-'As in the early 7th century.

Also in the 9th century, Ya'qubi (died 897/8 CE) wrote that Yubna was an ancient city built on a hill that was inhabited by Samaritans.

Al-Muqaddasi, writing around 985, said that "Yubna has a beautiful mosque. From this place come the excellent figs known by the name of Damascene." Yaqut wrote that in Yubna there was a tomb said to be that of Abu Hurairah, the companion (sahaba) of the Prophet. The author of Marasid also adds that tomb seen here is also said to be that of ´Abd Allah ibn Abi Sarh, another companion (sahaba) of the Prophet.

In 2007, remains ranging from the Early Islamic period until the British Mandate period were uncovered. An additional kiln, and part of a commercial/industrial area were uncovered at the west of the tell in 2009.

Crusader, Ayyubid and Mamluk periods

The Crusaders called the city Ibelin and built a castle there in 1141. Two excavation seasons led by Professor Dan Bahat starting in 2005 revealed the main gate.  Its namesake noble family, the house of Ibelin, was important in the Kingdom of Jerusalem and later in the Kingdom of Cyprus. Ibelin was captured by Saladin in 1187. Salvage excavations at the west of the tell unearthed a stash of 53 Crusader coins of the 12th and 13th centuries.

Ibelin was first sacked by Saladin before his army was comprehensively routed at the Battle of Montgisard in late 1177. In August 1187, Yavne was retaken and burnt to the ground, and ceased for some time to form part of the Crusaders' kingdom.

Benjamin of Tudela (1130–1173) identified Jamnia (Jabneh) of classical writers with the Ibelin of the Crusades. He places the ancient city of Jamnia at three parasangs from Jaffa and two from Ashdod (Azotus).

Ibelin's parish church was transformed into a mosque, to which a minaret was added during the Mamluk period in 1337. The minaret survives until today, while the mosque (the former Crusader church) was blown up by the IDF in 1950.

Maqām Abu Hurayra, described as "one of the finest domed mausoleums in Palestine", is located in Yavne. Since the 12th century, it has been known as a tomb of Abu Hurairah, a companion (sahaba) of the Islamic prophet Muhammad. After 1948 the shrine has been taken over by Sephardic Jews who believe that the tomb is the burial place of Rabbi Gamaliel of Yavne.

Ottoman period
In 1596, Yibna was part of the Ottoman Empire, nahiya (subdistrict) of Gaza under the liwa' (district) of Gaza with a population of 129 households, an estimated 710 persons, all Muslims.  The villagers paid a fixed tax rate of 25% on a number of crops, including wheat, barley, summer crops, sesame seeds and fruits, as well as goats, beehives and vineyards; a total of 34,000 Akçe. 16/24 of the revenue went to a waqf.

In 1799, it was noted on the map that Pierre Jacotin compiled that year, named Ebneh.

An American missionary,  William Thomson, who visited Yibna in 1834, described it as a village on hill inhabited by 3,000 Muslim residents who worked in agriculture. He wrote that an inscription on the mosque indicated that it had been built in 1386, while Denys Pringle indicates 1337 as the construction year of the minaret.  In 1838, Yebna was noted as a Muslim village in the  Gaza district.

An  Ottoman  village list from about  1870  found that  Jebna had  a population of 1042, in  348  houses, though the population count included men, only.

In 1882, the PEF's Survey of Western Palestine described Yibna  as a large village partly built of stone and situated on a hill. It had olive trees and corn to the north, and gardens nearby.

British Mandate

In 1921, an elementary school for boys was founded in Yibna. By 1941-42 it had 445 students. A school for girls was founded in 1943, and by 1948 it had 44 students.

In the  1922 census of Palestine conducted by the British Mandate authorities, Yebna had a population of 1,791 inhabitants; all Muslims, increasing in the 1931 census to 3,600 inhabitants; 2 Jews, 7 Christians, 1 Bahai, and 3,590 Muslims, in a total of 794 houses.

In 1941, Kibbutz Yavne was established nearby by refugees from Germany, followed by a Youth Aliyah village, Givat Washington, in 1946.

In 1944-45 the village had a population of 5,420; 5,400 Muslims and 20 Christians, while the total land area was 59,554 dunams, according to an official land and population survey.
In addition there were 1,500 nomads living around the village. A total of 6,468 dunums of village land was used for citrus and bananas, 15,124 dunums were used for cereals,  11,091 dunums were irrigated or used for orchards, of which 25 dunums were planted with olive trees, while 127 dunams were classified as built-up, urban areas.

1948 and aftermath

Yibna was in the territory allotted to the Jewish state under the 1947 UN Partition Plan. In mid-March 1948, a contingent of Iraqi soldiers moved into the village. In a Haganah reprisal on March 30, two dozen villagers were killed. On April 21, the village commander was arrested by the British authorities for the drunken shooting of two Arabs.

During the Arab-Israeli war, residents of Zarnuqa sought refuge in Yibna, but left after the villagers accused them of being traitors.

On 27 May, following the fall of Al-Qubayba and Zarnuqa, most of the population of Yibna fled to Isdud, but armed males were refused entry. On 5 June, when Israeli troops arrived, they found the village almost deserted apart from a few old people who were ordered to leave.

After 1948, a number of Israeli villages were founded on Yibna land: Kfar HaNagid and Beit Gamliel in 1949, Ben Zakai in 1950, Kfar Aviv (originally: "Kfar HaYeor") in 1951, Tzofiyya in 1955. According to Walid Khalidi, a railroad crosses the village. The old mosque and minaret, together with a shrine can still be seen, and some of the old houses are inhabited by Jewish and Arab families.

Archaeological excavations have revealed that part of the pre-1948 Arab village at Yibna was built on top of a Byzantine-period cemetery and refuse pits.

Cultural references
Palestinian artist Sliman Mansour made Yibna the subject of one of his paintings. The work, named for the village, was one of a series of four on destroyed Palestinian villages that he produced in 1988 in order to resist the cancellation of Palestinian history; the others being Yalo, Imwas and Bayt Dajan.

The harbour of Javneh

The harbour of ancient Yavneh has been identified on the coast at Minet Rubin (Arabic) or Yavne-Yam (Hebrew), where excavations have revealed fortification going back to the Bronze Age Hyksos. It has been in use from the Middle Bronze Age until the 12th century CE, when it was abandoned. For more see Yavne-Yam.

Notable residents/descendants
Abdel Aziz al-Rantissi
Muhammad Youssef al-Najjar
Mousa Mohammed Abu Marzook

See also
Depopulated Palestinian locations in Israel

References

Bibliography

 (p. 55 ff )
 
 

 
     
 

  

   p.  108  
  

        
 
   pp. 313-314

External links
 Welcome to Yibna
 Yibna,  Zochrot
Survey of Western Palestine, Map 16:   IAA, Wikimedia commons  
 Yibna at Khalil Sakakini Cultural Center
 Yousef Al Hums: 60 Years and Counting,  WREMEA, May–June 2008

District of Ramla
Arab villages depopulated during the 1948 Arab–Israeli War